The vanadyl or oxovanadium(IV) cation, VO2+, is a functional group that is common in the coordination chemistry of vanadium.  Complexes containing this functional group are characteristically blue and paramagnetic. A triple bond is proposed to exist between the V4+ and O2− centers. The description of the bonding in the vanadyl ion was central to the development of modern ligand-field theory.

Natural occurrence

Minerals
Cavansite and pentagonite are vanadyl-containing minerals.

Water
VO2+, often in an ionic pairing with sodium (NaH2VO4), is the second most abundant transition metal in seawater, with its concentration only being exceeded by molybdenum. In the ocean the average concentration is 30 nM. Some mineral water springs also contain the ion in high concentrations. For example, springs near Mount Fuji often contain as much as 54 μg per liter.

Vanadyl containing compounds

Oxovanadium(IV) 
 vanadyl acetylacetonate, VO(acac)2
 vanadyl sulfate pentahydrate, VOSO4·5H2O

Oxovanadium(V) 
 vanadyl isopropoxide, VO(O-iPr)3 (iPr denotes isopropyl)
 vanadyl nitrate, VO(NO3)3
 vanadyl perchlorate,

Related species
 pervanadyl ion, also known as the dioxovanadium(V) ion
 metavanadate ion, 
 orthovanadate ion, 
 thiovanadyl ion, VS2+
 titanyl ion, TiO2+
 niobyl ion, NbO2+
 tantalyl ion, TaO2+

References

External links

Oxycations